Rosenbergia weiskei is a species of beetle in the family Cerambycidae. It was described by Heller in 1902.

References

Batocerini
Beetles described in 1902